Thomas Dafydd was an 18th-century Welsh elegist and hymn writer.

Dafydd may have come from Llanegwad, Carmarthenshire. Between 1765 and 1792, he published approximately 20 booklets of hymns and elegies described prominent Methodists of his day.

References 

Welsh male poets
18th-century Welsh people
18th-century births
Year of death missing